John Andrew Orton (born December 8, 1965 in Santa Cruz, California) is an American professional baseball coach and a former Major League catcher. In , Orton will serve his tenth season as roving minor league catching coordinator for the Chicago White Sox. He is an alumnus of California Polytechnic State University, San Luis Obispo, where he was an all conference catcher.

Career
Drafted by the California Angels in the first round of the 1987 Major League Baseball Draft, Orton had a decade-long professional career, including parts of five seasons (1989–1993) with the Angels. In , he set personal bests in games played (43), plate appearances (125), hits (25), home runs (2), runs batted in (12) and batting average (.219).  All told, he collected 80 hits in 156 MLB games played, with 18 doubles and four home runs.

He became a manager in the White Sox' system in 2001, working for five years at the Rookie and Class A levels, before becoming a roving instructor.

References

1965 births
Living people
American expatriate baseball players in Canada
Anaheim Angels scouts
Baseball players from California
California Angels players
Cal Poly Mustangs baseball players
Edmonton Trappers players
Major League Baseball catchers
Midland Angels players
Norfolk Tides players
Palm Springs Angels players
Richmond Braves players
Salem Angels players
Sportspeople from Santa Cruz, California
Vancouver Canadians players
Anchorage Glacier Pilots players